The 2022 WAFF Women's Championship is an international women's football tournament held in Jordan from 29 August to 4 September 2022. The four national teams involved in the tournament were required to register a squad of 23 players, including three goalkeepers. Only players in these squads were eligible to take part in the tournament.

The age listed for each player is on 29 August 2022, the first day of the tournament. The numbers of caps and goals listed for each player do not include any matches played after the start of tournament. The club listed is the club for which the player last played a competitive match prior to the tournament. The nationality for each club reflects the national association (not the league) to which the club is affiliated. A flag is included for coaches who are of a different nationality than their own national team.

Teams

Jordan
Coach:  David Nascimento

Palestine
Coach: Nasser Beitello

Lebanon
Coach: Hagop Demirjian

Syria
Coach: Salim Jblawi

Notes

References

Squads
WAFF Women's Championship squads